Francine Leffler Ringold (born 1934) is an American writer and editor who was the 15th poet laureate of the State of Oklahoma.

Born and raised in New York City, Ringold in 1966 became the editor of Nimrod, the literary magazine of the University of Tulsa, where she earned her Ph.D. Ringold went on to edit Nimrod and teach at the University of Tulsa for nearly 50 years.

See also 

 Poets Laureate of Oklahoma

References

Living people
Poets Laureate of Oklahoma
1934 births
Date of birth missing (living people)
University of Tulsa alumni
University of Tulsa faculty
American women poets
20th-century American women writers
20th-century American poets
Women magazine editors
American literary editors
American magazine editors
Poets from New York (state)
Writers from New York City
American women academics
21st-century American women